The 2003 WGC-Accenture Match Play Championship was a golf tournament that was played from February 26 to March 2, 2003 at La Costa Resort and Spa in Carlsbad, California. It was the fifth WGC-Accenture Match Play Championship and the first of four World Golf Championships events held in 2003.

Tiger Woods won his sixth World Golf Championships event, and his first ever match play victory, by defeating David Toms 2 and 1 in the 36 hole final.

Brackets
The Championship was a single elimination match play event. The field consisted of the top 64 players available from the Official World Golf Rankings, seeded according to the rankings. Vijay Singh (ranked 4) withdrew with a rib injury, Nick Faldo (ranked 54) withdrew because of flu and Toru Taniguchi (ranked 55) withdrew because of injury. They were replaced by Robert Karlsson (ranked 65), Phil Tataurangi (ranked 66) and Carl Pettersson (ranked 67).

Bobby Jones bracket

Ben Hogan bracket

Gary Player bracket

Sam Snead bracket

Final Four

Breakdown by country

Prize money breakdown

References

External links
 Bracket PDF
 Golf Channel on event

WGC Match Play
Golf in California
Carlsbad, California
Sports competitions in San Diego County, California
WGC-Accenture Match Play Championship
WGC-Accenture Match Play Championship
WGC-Accenture Match Play Championship
WGC-Accenture Match Play Championship